Mohammad Mazeh is a Lebanese jurist who served as the urgent matters judge of Tyre until 2020. He issued an order preventing media outlets from conducting interviews with American Ambassador Dorothy Shea, accusing her of interference in Lebanon's internal affairs. On 30 June, he resigned from office in protest after he was called to appear before the Judicial Inspection Board. Justice Minister Marie-Claude Najm accepted his resignation on 14 July.

References

External links 

 https://yasour.org/2018/en/news/details/news-32993

Lebanese judges
Lebanese Shia Muslims
Living people
Year of birth missing (living people)